8 Out of 10 Cats Does Countdown is a British comedy panel show on Channel 4.  The show follows the game of  Countdown, but presented in a comedic panel show format seen on 8 Out of 10 Cats, with the show being a crossover of the two.

The show is hosted by Jimmy Carr, with Rachel Riley and Susie Dent assuming their Countdown roles. During most of the run, the two teams had regular captains Jon Richardson and Sean Lock; after Lock's death in 2021 his team has been led by a rotating series of guest captains while Richardson continues to be a regular captain (excepting when scheduling conflicts prevent him from appearing).

History
The formation of the crossover began as a series of specials, the first of which was broadcast on 2 January 2012, when Channel 4 orchestrated a special "mash-up night", merging two shows to form a special edition of the pair, as part of its 30th-anniversary celebrations. Amongst the programmes that were chosen to be merged for the evening of specials, production teams on Countdown and 8 Out of 10 Cats agreed to combine the two formats of their respective programmes – the crossover between the two formats meant that Countdowns arrangement of games would be interspersed with 8 Out of 10 Cats-style banter. As part of the merger, both Rachel Riley and Susie Dent assumed their roles from the programme, while Jimmy Carr took on the mantle of host, with both Sean Lock and Jon Richardson competing as contestants, and Joe Wilkinson joining Dent during the crossover's recording.

Following the first special, Channel 4 ordered another crossover special for 24 August 2012 as part of Channel 4's "Funny Fortnight", featuring the same cast as before, along with the appearances of David O'Doherty and former Countdown contestant Clarke Carlisle. In April 2013, a further two specials were ordered by the network, expanding on the merged formats but featuring the same cast, albeit with Lock unable to attend due to ill health and leading to Lee Mack standing in for him. As part of the expanded format, both Mack and Richardson were joined by an additional contestant each, for each special – Rhod Gilbert, Rob Beckett, Stephen Mangan and Richard Osman – with Dent joined by Tim Key and Henning Wehn respectively during recordings.

On 9 July 2013, owing to favourable ratings from the specials, Channel 4 announced its decision to commission a full series of six episodes of the crossover, which was aired from July to September. Following the first series, the network ordered additional series for 2014, 2015, 2016, and 2017.

On 13 July 2018, Channel 4 aired a special edition of the crossover series as part of commemorations towards 100 years of women's suffrage in the United Kingdom. As part of the special, all male members of the cast and crew were replaced, leaving the episode to feature an all-female cast – Katherine Ryan acted as host, while Roisin Conaty, Sara Pascoe, Jessica Hynes and Lolly Adefope participated as the contestants, with an appearance by Morgana Robinson as Natalie Cassidy.

On 11 February 2022, Channel 4 aired the last episode that Sean Lock recorded before his death.

Format
Each episode lasts one hour, including advertising breaks, although the January 2012 special lasted only 30 minutes. Since the first one-third of the programme is occupied in introducing the panel, and due to the comedy interspersed between and during rounds, the game does not consist of the standard 15 rounds. Carr asks each panelist if they have a 'mascot', and the panelist will then indulge in some prop comedy, usually showing off a ludicrous or impractical object and telling a humorous story. The first few specials had different numbers of rounds ranging from 7 to 10. In the first two full series of the show, there were either 8 or 9 rounds. The first three-quarters of the show contained a letters round and a numbers round; the last section had a letters round, a numbers round (if there was time) and a conundrum. More recent series featured rounds involving two contestants participating in humorous activities (usually for bonus points), such as being blindfolded and identifying props that were spelt with nine letters.

The letters and numbers rounds are the same as in Countdown, and there are also "Teatime Teasers". The conundrums and teatime teasers typically contain sexual words or innuendos but with usually innocent answers, such as "GONADTIP" (clue: "One way to become a parent", answer: "ADOPTING").

Whilst the clock is ticking, as the contestants attempt to find a word within 30 seconds, Carr often takes part in some form of unusual or non-sequitur activity such as trying to get a dog through an obstacle course, stacking a house of cards or enticing a bird of prey to fly onto his arm. Riley and occasionally Dent sometimes participate in these segments. These segments take place mostly, though not exclusively, in letters rounds.

Apart from during the first two specials, there are two contestants on each team, with Richardson and Lock as permanent guests through the episodes for 2021. During some rounds, contestants all offer an answer, but only the best answer from each team counts. During some rounds, one player per team is nominated to answer.

A celebrity appears in Dictionary Corner, and, after each numbers round, they present a poem, song or another comedic segment. Susie Dent's "Origin of Words" section does not appear but is instead replaced with an additional segment from the guest.

In earlier episodes, Joe Wilkinson appeared as Riley's assistant in the second half of the show, often dressed in costume whilst using props. The humour continued throughout the series, such as Wilkinson offering special prizes, replacing letter tiles with symbols, or turning up despite having been "fired".

Episodes

International broadcasts
In Australia, the show has aired on SBS Viceland since 7 August 2018 from the beginning, as well as on SBS. Later series have also aired on the pay TV channel BBC UKTV since 23 October 2018. In New Zealand the show has also been very popular, screening on two free-to-air TVNZ channels TVNZ 2 and TVNZ Duke, as well as BBC UKTV on pay TV provider Sky (New Zealand). In the United States and Canada certain series of the programme are available on Britbox.

Reception

Ratings
The first mashup was watched by 2.49 million viewers, making it the second-most-watched Channel 4 show that week. The next episode, part of "Funny Fortnight", received 1.76 million viewers, which was an 8.3% audience share. The 2014 Christmas special was watched by 1.75 million viewers, a 7.6% audience share.

Awards
In 2014, 8 Out of 10 Cats Does Countdown was nominated for the British Comedy Awards in two categories: Best Comedy Panel Programme and Best Comedy Moment of 2014. Sean Lock was also nominated for Best Male Television Comic, and Joe Wilkinson was nominated for Best Comedy Breakthrough Artist.

References

External links

The Countdown Wiki

2012 British television series debuts
2010s British comedy television series
2020s British comedy television series
Channel 4 comedy
Channel 4 panel games
Countdown (game show)
English-language television shows
Television series by ITV Studios
Television series by Zeppotron